Marble Hill is the name of:

Australia 
Marble Hill, South Australia, the vice-regal residence in the Adelaide Hills

Ireland 
Marble Hill, County Donegal, a village in County Donegal

United Kingdom 
Marble Hill House, a villa on the banks of the River Thames near London
Marble Hill Park, an English Heritage park surrounding Marble Hill House

United States 
Marble Hill, Indiana
Marble Hill, Missouri
Marble Hill, Manhattan, a section of the borough of Manhattan in New York City
Marble Hill – 225th Street (IRT Broadway – Seventh Avenue Line), a subway station serving that neighborhood via the  train
Marble Hill (Metro-North station), a Metro-North Hudson Line commuter rail station serving that neighborhood
Marble Hill, Tennessee, a neighborhood in Lynchburg
Marble Hill Nuclear Power Plant, an unfinished nuclear power plant in southern Indiana, USA

See also
Marblehill, Georgia, a town in Pickens County, Georgia, U.S.
Marble Hills, a range of hills in West Antarctica